The Dealer is an Egyptian film produced in 2008 starring Ahmed El Sakka, Khaled El Nabawy and Mai Selim. The movie was filmed in 2008 and released in 2010.

Plot
In the first half of the film, Youssef El-Sheikh (Ahmed El Sakka) and Ali El-Halawany (Khaled El Nabawy had a big fight between them since childhood that ends up with prison for Youssef and immigration of Ali to Ukraine.

In Ukraine, Ali works with drug dealers and smuggles money to an unknown location, and Samah (Mai Selim), Ali's wife and Youssef's ex-lover takes her child to afterwards marry a Ukrainian lady and become a president of Ukraine 

Youssef travels to Turkey to work in the drug trade. After that, Youssef and Ali meet again, and the story ends when they became close friends, Ali was assassinated by man called (Turky) to take revenge from him when his wife was with Ali .

Cast 
Ahmed El Sakka as Yossef El-Sheikh
Khaled El Nabawy as Ali El-Halawany
Mai Selim as Samah
Nidal El-Shafey as Farahat El-Kurdi
Selami Şahin as a Turkish drug trader
Boris Abramov as a Ukraine drug trader 
Sami El Adl as Hassan
Menna Fadali as Bothina Youssef's Sister
Yasmine Elqammash as Batta Youssef’s Sister
Sabri Abdel-Monaem as El-Sheikh Youssef’s Father
Botros Ghali as Amin El-Halawany Ali's Father
Talaat Zain as an Egyptian drug trader

References 

2010 films
2010 action films
2010s Arabic-language films
Egyptian crime films
Ukrainian-language films
2010s Turkish-language films
Egyptian action films
2010 multilingual films
Egyptian multilingual films